Perry Young may refer to:

 Perry Young (aviator) (1919–1998), American aviator
 Perry Young (basketball) (born 1963), American retired basketball player